The 1997–98 Liga Alef season saw Ahi Nazareth and Beitar Be'er Sheva promoted to Liga Artzit as the respective winners of the North and South division.

At the bottom, Hapoel Karmiel, Maccabi Hadera (from North division), Hapoel Kiryat Ono and Hapoel Yehud (from South division) were all relegated to Liga Bet.

North Division

South Division

References
Alef and Bet Leagues 1995-1998  Eran R, Israblog 

Liga Alef seasons
3
Israel